Lee Wright (born 28 August 1944 in Vancouver, British Columbia) is a Canadian former field hockey player who competed in the 1964 Summer Olympics and in the 1976 Summer Olympics.

References

External links
 

1944 births
Living people
Field hockey players from Vancouver
Canadian male field hockey players
Olympic field hockey players of Canada
Field hockey players at the 1964 Summer Olympics
Field hockey players at the 1976 Summer Olympics
Pan American Games medalists in field hockey
Pan American Games silver medalists for Canada
Pan American Games bronze medalists for Canada
Field hockey players at the 1967 Pan American Games
Field hockey players at the 1971 Pan American Games
Field hockey players at the 1975 Pan American Games
Medalists at the 1971 Pan American Games
Medalists at the 1975 Pan American Games